"Patience" is a song by British YouTuber and recording artist KSI featuring British singer-songwriter Yungblud and American rapper Polo G. It was released for digital download and streaming by RBC Records and BMG on 12 March 2021 as the third single from KSI's second studio album, All Over the Place (2021). The three artists wrote the song alongside Digital Farm Animals, Red Triangle, YAMI, S-X, Diego Ave, Yoshi, Peter Jideonwo and Matt Schwartz, with the latter handling the song's production.

The song received positive reviews from music critics. It debuted at number three on the UK Singles Chart and it has been certified silver by the British Phonographic Industry (BPI) for exceeding sales of 200,000 units in the UK. The song placed at number 5 on the US Bubbling Under Hot 100 chart and additionally entered the singles charts of Australia, Belgium, Canada, Croatia, Denmark, Hungary, Ireland, Lithuania, the Netherlands, New Zealand, Norway, Slovakia and Sweden. The music video was released on 15 March 2021. An acoustic version was released one week after the release of the song.

Writing and production 
Speaking to MTV, Yungblud said, "We wanted to do something that is unexpected and bizarre and wacky. We were just mates in a studio making music and it sounded good, so we put it out."

Release and promotion 
"Patience" was released for digital download and streaming by RBC Records and BMG on 12 March 2021 as the third single from KSI's second studio album. The song's cover art depicts the three artists as cartoon characters, standing around an hourglass in the centre of a purple background. An audio video was released to KSI's YouTube channel on the same day as the song's release. A lyric video was released to Yungblud's YouTube channel one day later.

An acoustic version of "Patience" was released alongside an audio video on 19 March 2021.

Music video 
The music video for "Patience" was co-directed by Troy Roscoe and Nayip Ramos. It premiered on KSI's YouTube channel on 15 March 2021. A behind-the-scenes video of the music video shoot was released by MTV two days before. KSI uploaded a reaction video in which he and Yungblud watch the music video to YouTube on 29 March 2021.

Commercial performance 
In the United Kingdom, "Patience" was the most downloaded song of that week. It debuted at number three on the UK Singles Chart, making it the highest-placed new entry of that week. It stood as KSI's sixth UK top 10 single and first for Yungblud and Polo G. On 11 June 2021, "Patience" was certified silver by the British Phonographic Industry (BPI) for exceeding sales of 200,000 track-equivalent units in the UK. On 9 August 2022, Music Week reported that "Patience" has sold 331,573 units in the UK.

In Ireland, "Patience" debuted at number eight on the Irish Singles Chart, making it the highest-placed new entry of that week. Elsewhere in Europe, the song charted at number 37 in Denmark, number 15 in Hungary, number 85 in Lithuania and number 37 in Norway. In Australia, "Patience" debuted at number 61 on the ARIA Singles Chart. In Canada, "Patience" debuted at number 94 on the Canadian Hot 100. In the United States, "Patience" peaked at number five on both the Bubbling Under Hot 100 and Digital Songs Sales charts and earned KSI a spot on Billboard'''s Emerging Artists chart. "Patience" charted at number 102 on the Billboard'' Global 200 chart.

Credits and personnel 
Credits adapted from Tidal.

 KSIsongwriting, vocals
 Yungbludsongwriting, vocals
 Polo Gsongwriting, vocals
 Matt Schwartzproduction, songwriting
 Digital Farm Animalssongwriting
 Red Trianglesongwriting
 YAMIsongwriting
 S-Xsongwriting
 Diego Avesongwriting
 Yoshisongwriting
 Peter Jideonwosongwriting
 John Hanesengineering
 Serban Gheneaengineering
 Joe LaPortaengineering
 Chris Greattiproduction, engineering (acoustic version only)

Charts

Certifications

Release history

See also 
 List of UK top-ten singles in 2021
 List of UK Singles Downloads Chart number ones of the 2020s
 List of top 10 singles in 2021 (Ireland)

References 

2021 songs
2021 singles
KSI songs
Yungblud songs
Polo G songs
Songs written by KSI
Songs written by Yungblud
Songs written by Polo G
Songs written by Matt Schwartz
Songs written by Digital Farm Animals
Songs written by Rick Parkhouse
Songs written by George Tizzard
Songs written by S-X
RBC Records singles
BMG Rights Management singles
Synth-pop songs